Many skin conditions require a skin biopsy for confirmation of the diagnosis.  With several of these conditions there are features within the cells contained in the skin biopsy specimen that have elements in their cytoplasm or nucleus that have a characteristic appearance unique to the condition.  These elements are termed inclusion bodies.

See also 
 List of contact allergens
 List of cutaneous conditions
 List of genes mutated in cutaneous conditions
 List of target antigens in pemphigus
 List of specialized glands within the human integumentary system

References 

 
 

Dermatology-related lists